Hazmat Modine is a musical group based in New York City and led by singer/songwriter and multi-instrumentalist Wade Schuman. Their music is rooted in blues and also touches on folk, jazz and World music. The most recent lineup of the  band circa 2015 features harmonica, tuba, trumpet, saxophone, drums and two guitars, as well as solo and harmony vocals.

"Hazmat" is a portmanteau of "hazardous material", and "Modine" is a brand of heater.

History
Founded in the late 1990s by songwriter Wade Schuman (vocals and harmonica, occasional guitar and other instruments), the band in their formative years also featured mainstays Joe Daley (tuba, sousaphone) and Randy Weinstein (harmonica). Other personnel varied considerably, including not only performers on guitar, drums and sax but also exotic oddities like cimbalom and bass marimba.

Their debut album was recorded over a five-year span and earned positive critical notice. Hazmat Modine was featured on the National Public Radio program "All Things Considered" on October 25, 2006, and on the Australian Broadcasting Corporation program "The Daily Planet" on May 29, 2006.

Their second Hazmat Modine album featured a more stable lineup, though Weinstein has parted ways with the band.

In 2013 Wade Schuman enlisted his friend Erik Della Penna to join the band as a guitarist, co-vocalist and songwriter.  Schuman wanted the band to evolve into one that had more vocal harmonies, he was becoming more interested in the long tradition of American songwriting by the likes of Irving Berlin, Fats Waller, Doc Pomus, Hays & Porter. A live album followed in 2014, and a studio album in 2015.

Hazmat Modine has collaborated with Huun-Huur-Tu and Alash, both bands a from Kyzl Tuva in Central Asia. Also, Natalie Merchant, Kronos Quartet, Gangbe Brass Band from Benin, and Balla Kouyate from Mali

Critical reception
The band's first album, titled Bahamut and released in the US on the Barbès Records label, peaked at #12 on Billboard's "Top Blues Albums" chart.

Reviewing the album for Allmusic, Jeff Tamarkin gave it four stars out of a possible five, and termed it a "stunning debut". Tamarkin praised the band for successfully fusing styles as disparate as blues, jazz, calypso, and ska into "music that sounds at once ageless and primeval, authentically indigenous and inexplicably otherworldly, familiar and unlike anything else." He also praised the group for making "listener-friendly music" that doesn't "require a degree in ethnomusicology to enjoy".

Pitchfork Media reviewer Joe Tangari gave the album's track "Everybody Loves You", a collaboration with Tuvan throat singers Huun-Huur-Tu, a four-star review. Characterizing it as "generalized roots music that takes from pretty much any roots it sees fit," he praised it as "true world music, weird and wonderful to the last note."

Members
 Wade Schuman: Diatonic harmonica and lead vocals, guitar, pan flute, songwriting
 Erik Della Penna: Guitars, banjo guitar, vocals, songwriting
 Joseph Daley: Tuba, sousaphone
 Pamela Fleming: Trumpet, flugelhorn
 Steve Elson: Tenor saxophone, duduk, contra alto clarinet, flute
 Reut Regev: Trombone
 Patrick Simard: Drums
 Daisy Castro Violin

Past or intermittent members
 Bill Barrett:- harmonica
 Scott Veenstra:- drums
 Randy Weinstein:- harmonica
 Pete Smith - guitar
 Richard Livingston Huntley - drums
 Henry Bogdan - lap steel guitar
 Michaela Gomez, Guitar, Lap Steel
 Graham Hawthorne, Drums
 Rachelle Garniez, Vocals, Accordion
 Tim Keiper, Drums
 Kevin Garcia, Drums
 Bob Jay, Guitar
 Thor Jenson, Guitar
 Charlie Burnham, Violin

Discography

References

External links

Official website
2008 Interview with Wade Schuman

American blues musical groups
American folk musical groups
American jazz ensembles from New York City
Musical groups from New York City
World fusion groups
Jazz musicians from New York (state)